René is a given name and a surname.

René may also refer to:

René (novella), an 1802 novella by François-René de Chateaubriand
René 41, a nickel based superalloy
René, Sarthe, a French commune
"René" (song), a 2020 song by Residente
Renê (footballer) (born 1992), Brazilian footballer

See also
Saint-René (disambiguation)